Nikolayevka is a rural locality (a selo) in Petropavlovskoye Rural Settlement, Liskinsky District, Voronezh Oblast, Russia. The population was 80 as of 2010. There are 2 streets.

Geography 
Nikolayevka is located 38 km southeast of Liski (the district's administrative centre) by road. Pereyezheye is the nearest rural locality.

References 

Rural localities in Liskinsky District